ABSL may refer to:

 "Adapter, Bus, SCSI-ID, and LUN", a computer term for device addressing 
 The Amundsen-Bellingshausen Seas Low, a climatological low-pressure area located over the Pacific sector of the Southern Ocean
 Al-Sayyid Bedouin Sign Language, used by members of a Bedouin community in the Negev desert of southern Israel
 Assistant Beaver Scout Leader, in the Beaver scouts